American Mail Line of Seattle, Washington was a commercial steamship service with routes to and from Seattle, Washington and the Far East.
American Mail Line was founded in 1920, by Pacific Steamship Company also with a $500,000 investment from Dollar Shipping Company. The American Mail Line operated regular service until June 1938. American Mail Line was not profitable and ran with subsidies from Dollar, due to the cancellation of the ocean mail contracts. American Mail Line - And their affiliate Dollar Steamship Lines operated Trans-Pacific Routes, primarily from China and Japan to Canada and the United States. Some of the American Mail Line ships come for the Admiral Oriental Company when Dollar became the owner of Admiral Oriental Line. Admiral Oriental Line formed by H. F. Alexander was acquired in 1922 and renamed the American Mail Line

The American Mail Line ran Trans-Pacific Steamship Routes between the main ports of: Seattle, Victoria, Yokohama, Kobe, Shanghai, Hong Kong, Manila, and Honolulu. The Dollar Steamship Lines and the main owner of American Mail Line offered passengers joint service routes.
In 1938 only service to and from California was offered. Regular service ended in 1938. After 1938 charter shipping was provided, American Mail Line was active with the Maritime Commission and War Shipping Administration during World War 2 and the Vietnam War. During wartime the American Mail Line operated Victory ships and Liberty ships, also a few Empire ships.  

After World War 2 American Mail Line started Regular services again with a line of "Mail" Ships. The "Mail ship" China Mail, Island Mail, were a C2-SU design, built by Sun Yards of Chester, Pennsylvania.
In 1965 the American Mail Line acquired a line of five Type C4-class ship ships, C4-S-1s.

Services 
Regular Passenger and mail service ships in 1923 and 1936, from the Admiral Oriental Line: 	
President Jackson
President Jefferson
SS Pine Tree State
President Madison  (American ocean liner in service 1922–1938)
President McKinley 	

Regular service ports of call in 1923 and 1936: Seattle, Seattle, Victoria, Yokohama, Kobe, Shanghai, Hong Kong, Manila.

Regular Passenger service ships in started in 1948: (service years)
SS Java Mail (1948-1969)
SS Island Mail  (1948-1959)
SS Ocean Mail
India Mail (1948-1965)
SS China Mail  (1948-1959)
SS Oregon Mail 
SS Schuyler O. Bland (1957-1959)

Regular Passenger service ports of call in 1957 for the above:
Portland, Vancouver, Seattle, Yokohama, Kobe, Manila, Cebu, Iloilo, Hong Kong, Kobe, Nagoya, Yokohama, Pacific Northwest ports. 

Regular Passenger service ships starting in 1957:
Java Mail
Island Mail
American Mail
Canada Mail

Regular service ports of call in 1957 for the above:
Portland, Vancouver, Seattle, Yokohama, Kobe, Hong Kong, Manila, Cebu, Iloilo, Singapore, Penang, Port Swettenham, Medan, Singapore, Djakarta, Philippine ports, California ports and Pacific Northwest ports. 

Regular Passenger service ships in started about 1965 with C4 Mariner-class ships: (service years)
SS Ocean Mail (2) (1965-1974)
SS Canada Mail  (1965-1974) 
SS Japan Mail  (1965-1974) 
SS Washington Mail  (1965-1974)
SS Philippine Mail  (1965-1971)

Cargo ships 
The largest general cargo liners in 1969.
 Alaskan Mail 1968, renamed SS Cape Girardeau 1978. Assigned for non-retention in National Defense Reserve Fleet as of April 2020
 Indian Mail renamed ,assigned for non-retention in the National Defense Reserve Fleet as of April 2020
 Korean Mail built 1969, scrapped 1995.  (staterooms for twelve passengers)
 Hong Kong Mail built 1968,  renamed  in 1978, scrapped June 2008.
 American Mail (1969) later renamed SS Cleveland, scrapped 2009

World War II

The SS Alhambra Victory and others were run by its American Mail Line crew and the US Navy supplied United States Navy Armed Guards to man the deck guns and radio. The most common armament mounted on these merchant ships were the MK II 20mm Oerlikon autocannon and the 3"/50, 4"/50, and 5"/38 deck guns. 

Operated during World War II:
 SS Alhambra Victory
 SS Appleton Victory
 SS Cabell
MS Cape Flattery (1940)
 SS John S. Copley
 SS Cushing Eells
 SS George Clymer
 SS George R. Holmes
 SS Gilbert Stuart
SS Joel Palmer
 SS Francis W. Pettygrove
 SS John A. Johnson
 SS John B. Kendrick
 SS John Lind
 SS Ida M. Tarbell
 SS Norway Victory
 SS Mankato Victory
 SS Meriwether Lewis
 Empire Peregrine
 SS Samakron
 SS Samfaithful
 SS Samuel Parker
 SS Sidney Edgerton
SS Temple Victory
 SS Thomas A. Hendricks
SS Tufts Victory
 SS R. P. Warner
 SS Ralph Barnes
 SS William H. Dall
 SS West Cressey

Sank or damaged:
Capillo Dec. 8, 1941 bombed, later sunk by U.S. Army
Coldbrook June 2, 1942 ran aground, total loss 
Collingsworth Jan. 9, 1943 torpedoed 
John S. Copley Dec. 16, 1943 torpedoed, damaged 
Crown City Sept. 2, 1942 ran aground 
Francis W. Pettygrove Aug. 13, 1943 torpedoed 
George Clymers June 7, 1942 torpedoed 
Meriweather Lewis March 2, 1943 torpedoed 
Samuel Parker July 22, 1943 several direct hits was repaired 
John A. Johnson Oct. 30, 1944 torpedoed

Korean War
 SS Canada Mail 
 SS Union Victory
 SS Allegheny Victory
 SS New World Victory

Vietnam War
Red Oak Victory
 SS Dartmouth Victory - SS Alaska Mail in 1960
 SS Great Falls Victory
 SS Las Vegas Victory
 SS Navajo Victory
 SS North Platte Victory
 SS Mayfield Victory

References

Defunct shipping companies of the United States
Transport companies established in 1920
Transport companies disestablished in 1974
1920 establishments in Washington (state)
1920 mergers and acquisitions